Jill Reeve (born November 1, 1969 in Hoosick Falls, New York) is a former field hockey defender from the United States, who earned a total number of 134 caps for the Women's National Team, in which she scored eight goals.

International Senior Tournaments
 1994 – World Cup, Dublin, Ireland (3rd)
 1995 – Pan American Games, Mar del Plata, Argentina (2nd)
 1995 – Champions Trophy, Mar del Plata, Argentina (3rd)
 1996 – Summer Olympics, Atlanta, USA (5th)
 1997 – Champions Trophy, Berlin, Germany (6th)
 1998 – World Cup, Utrecht, The Netherlands (8th)
 1999 – Pan American Games, Winnipeg, Canada (2nd)
 2000 – Olympic Qualifying Tournament, Milton Keynes, England (6th)
 2001 – Pan America Cup, Kingston, Jamaica (2nd)
 2002 – Champions Challenge, Johannesburg, South Africa (5th)
 2002 – USA vs India WC Qualifying Series, Cannock, England (1st)
 2002 – World Cup, Perth, Australia (9th)
 2003 – Champions Challenge, Catania, Italy (5th)

References
 Profile on US Field Hockey
 Head Coaching Profile at Miami (OH)

External links
 

1969 births
Living people
American female field hockey players
Field hockey players at the 1996 Summer Olympics
Old Dominion Monarchs field hockey players
Olympic field hockey players of the United States
People from Hoosick Falls, New York
Pan American Games silver medalists for the United States
Pan American Games medalists in field hockey
Field hockey players at the 1995 Pan American Games
Field hockey players at the 1999 Pan American Games
Medalists at the 1995 Pan American Games
Medalists at the 1999 Pan American Games